Nocardioides exalbidus is a rod-shaped and non-motile bacterium from the genus Nocardioides which has been isolated from lichen on the Izu Ōshima Island, Japan.

References

Further reading

External links
Type strain of Nocardioides exalbidus at BacDive -  the Bacterial Diversity Metadatabase	

exalbidus
Bacteria described in 2007